Hon. Barr. Manuela George-Izunwa is a Nigerian politician who served as Rivers State Commissioner of Women Affairs from 2007 until 2009. In her tenure, she campaigned for better treatment of widows, economic empowerment of women, prevention of abuse, improvements to health, and girl's education.

Education

She studied law at the Rivers State University of Science and Technology and became a barrister after finishing her Law School at Bwari, Abuja. She also holds a master's degree in public administration from University of Port Harcourt.

Career

Commissioner 
In 2007, George-Izunwa was appointed as Rivers State Commissioner of Women Affairs by Rotimi Amaechi, then Governor of Rivers State.

Support for widows 
In June 2009, speaking to the Rivers State House of Assembly, Izunwa praised the house for enacting gender-friendly laws, and asked them to pass further laws to enable widows return to normal life after the death of their husbands. She lobbied for the passing of a law on widowhood rights. In April 2010, she noted that over 7,000 women have benefited from the state-run micro-credit scheme for widows.

Economic training and assistance 
In November 2009 Izunwa announced that the Women Affairs ministry was launching a mass literacy program for adult women, particularly in rural areas, which would also train women in skills related to food production, processing and marketing. That month she applauded an initiative by Shell Nigeria to launch a micro credit programme in which members of the Ijaw Mothers Union would get loans to run businesses. In March 2010, Izumwa accompanied Dame Judith Amaechi, wife of Rivers State governor Rotimi Amaechi, to Israel to inspect farms and discuss training and development of agriculture among women in Rivers State.

Girl Child Education 
In May 2010, her Growing into Real Life (G.I.R.L) outreach program in partnership with the Women Affairs ministry began. The G.I.R.L project is to birth the PEARL Club in all schools of the State. In July 2010, Izunwa said her ministry was partnering with Judith Amaechi's Empowerment Support Initiative to provide training in technical skills for youth in the state in the expectation that the program would help improve the economy and reduce poverty.

Prevention of abuse 
In December 2009, Izunwa urged Rivers State Police Commissioner, Mr Suleman Abba, to initiate a zero tolerance policy for violence against women and to stop the practice of granting bail to rape suspects. That month she organized a seminar to discuss the problem, attended by many influential women in the state, as part of the International Day for the Elimination of Violence against Women.
In 2010, Izunwa's Ministry organized a 16-day activism program to end violence against women and organized awareness campaigns in market places and local government areas in collaboration with Doctors Without Borders. The ministry holds weekly counseling sessions for victims of abuse.

Health 
In March 2010, Izunwa expressed worry over the increasing rate of maternal mortality, which she ascribed to ignorance, poverty and diseases, and called on health care practitioners to assist in ensuring that women knew where and when to get help. In April 2010, she used a television spot to inform women that there was a mammogram centre at Churchill Health centre, Port Harcourt, and advised women to conduct self breast examination as well as to go for breast cancer screening.

Other Leadership Positions 
She is a member of the NBA, FIDA, ICMC, and a fellow of the Mentoring and Career Development Institute of Nigeria (MCDI).

In Port Harcourt, she runs the prestigious SITRID International School and a faith based organisation, Deborah's Cradle, for women leaders and aspiring leaders. 

George-Izunwa founded the NGO Girls' Organisation for Leadership and Development (GOLD) in 2014.

She currently serves as a board member of the National Agency for the Control of AIDS (NACA).

Writing 
George-Izunwa has written several books, including Stretch (Vol 1&2), Overcoming Self-doubt and Don't Die in Your Nest.

Personal Life 
George-Izunwa is the convener of Stretch Summit for women in ministry. Together with her husband, Pastor George Izunwa, she pastors at Gateway International Church.

She has three children: Michelle, Mirabel and Mickel.

References

External links

1974 births
Living people
Rivers State Peoples Democratic Party politicians
Rivers State University alumni
Commissioners of ministries of Rivers State
Nigerian Christians
Women government ministers of Nigeria